Central House, also known as the Tavern Inn, is a historic home located at Napoleon, Ripley County, Indiana.  It was built in the late-1820s, and is a two-story, Federal style brick building. It has a side gable roof with stepped gable ends. The interior consists of three rooms on each floor.  It was one of several buildings at Napoleon that operated as inns along the Cincinnati-Indianapolis stagecoach line.

It was added to the National Register of Historic Places in 1982.

References

Houses on the National Register of Historic Places in Indiana
Federal architecture in Indiana
Houses completed in 1825
Buildings and structures in Ripley County, Indiana
National Register of Historic Places in Ripley County, Indiana